Retailleau is a French surname. Notable people with the surname include:

 Bruno Retailleau (born 1960), French politician
 Sylvie Retailleau (born 1965), French politician
 Valentin Retailleau (born 2000), French cyclist

Surnames of French origin
French-language surnames